Epesse could refer to:

Epesses, a commune in Switzerland
Les Epesses, a commune in France
Epessë, a type of an elven name in J. R. R. Tolkien's fantasy universe Middle-earth